Teodor Marian Talowski (born March 23, 1857 in Zasów, died May 1, 1910 in Lviv) was a Polish architect and painter.  Because of his style, which combined late Historicism with Art Nouveau and Modernist influences, he has been described as "the Polish Gaudi". His works include apartment buildings, churches, chapels and public buildings in Kraków, Lviv and other cities throughout former Austrian Galicia.

Biography

Talowski was born in Zassów (now Zasów) near Tarnów, in Austrian Galicia, and attended a gymnasium in Kraków. Later he moved to Vienna, where he studied architecture under Karl König. After two years he moved to Lviv, to study under Julian Zachariewicz at Lviv Polytechnic, from which he graduated in 1881.
He came back to Kraków to be a professor at the Higher School of Technology and Industry (Polish: Wyższa Szkoła Techniczo-Przemysłowa).
In 1901 he was appointed the chair of the Department of Drawing and later the Department of Medieval Architecture Composition at Lviv Polytechnic.

Throughout his whole professional life, Talowski worked mainly in Galicia, designing public utility buildings as well as private houses. The works of Talowski are set in eclecticism, showing strong connections with historicism and Art Nouveau.

He died prematurely in 1910 in Lviv after five years of poor health and was interred at the Rakowicki Cemetery in Kraków.

Main works

Residential buildings

 Complex of apartment buildings in Kraków at 1,3,7,9,15 Retoryka street:
1 Retoryka Street - Under the Singing Frog (Pol. Pod śpiewającą żabą), 1889–90
7 Retoryka Street - Festina Lente, 1887
9 Retoryka Street - Under the Ass (Pod Osłem), 1891
15 Retoryka Street - Think Long, Act Fast (Długo myśl, prędko czyń), 1888
 Talowski's own house Under the Spider (Pol. Pod pająkiem) on Karmelicka Street, Kraków, 1889
 Apartment building at 18 Smoleńsk Street, Kraków, Under the Dragon (Pod Smokiem), 1887

Churches

Talowski designed over 70 churches, including:

 Church of St. Elizabeth in Lviv, Ukraine (1903–11)
 St. Mary of the Perpetual Assistance Church in Ternopil, Ukraine (1903–08)
 St. Elizabeth Church in Nowy Sącz
 St. Casimir Church in Nowy Sącz
 St. Nicholas Church in Przyszowa
 Parochial Church in Sucha Beskidzka
 Jesus' Transfiguration Church in Libiąż
 St. Stanisław Church in Osobnica
 Assumption of St. Mary Church in Kamianka-Buzka
 St. Anne Church in Wadowice Górne
 All Saints' Church in Chorzelów
 Church of St. Anthony of Padua in Nagoszyn
 Church of St. Stanislaw the Bishop in Łańcut, (alteration)
 Sacred Heart of Jesus Church in Bóbrka
 St. Sophia and St. Stephen Church in Laszki
 St. Anne Church in Skalat, Ukraine
 Sacred Heart of Jesus Church, Stoyaniv, Ukraine
 The Polish church in Cacica, Romania

Other works

 Lubicz Street Viaduct in Kraków
 Brothers Hospitallers of St. John of God Hospital in Kraków
 Dąbrowski Manor in Michałowice
 Kraków electric works building
 Żeleński's palace in Grodkowice near Kraków
 Talowski's family tomb at the Rakowicki Cemetery
 Dobiecki Manor House in Cianowice Duże

Gallery

See also
History of Lviv
Julian Zachariewicz

References

Sources

Maciej Gutowski, Bartłomiej Gutowski, Architektura Secesyjna w Galicji, DiG publishing, Warsaw 2001, p. 23-27 (in Polish).

External links
 www.talowski.pl (in Polish)
 www.talowski.prv.pl (in Polish)
 Pictures of apartment buildings at Retoryka street, Kraków (in Polish)
 Pictures of Talowski's churches from the Diocese of Tarnów (in Polish)

1857 births
1910 deaths
Polish Austro-Hungarians
People from the Kingdom of Galicia and Lodomeria
Artists from Kraków
Architects from Kraków
Architects from Lviv
People from Dębica County